The 1954–55 William & Mary Indians men's basketball team represented the College of William & Mary in intercollegiate basketball during the 1954–55 NCAA men's basketball season. Under the third year of head coach Boydson Baird, the team finished the season 11–14, 7–5 in the Southern Conference. This was the 50th season of the collegiate basketball program at William & Mary, whose nickname is now the Tribe. William & Mary played its home games at Blow Gymnasium.

The Indians finished in 6th place in the conference and qualified for the 1955 Southern Conference men's basketball tournament, held at the Richmond Arena. However, William & Mary fell to Richmond in the quarterfinals.

Program notes
William & Mary played two teams for the first time this season: Tennessee and Vanderbilt.
The Indians competed in their first-ever regular season tournament or invitational when they took part in the UR Invitational, hosted by the University of Richmond, at Richmond Arena in December 1954.

Schedule

|-
!colspan=9 style="background:#006400; color:#FFD700;"| Regular season

|-
!colspan=9 style="background:#006400; color:#FFD700;"| 1955 Southern Conference Basketball Tournament

Source

References

William & Mary Tribe men's basketball seasons
William and Mary Indians
William and Mary Indians Men's Basketball Team
William and Mary Indians Men's Basketball Team